The 1949–50 National Hurling League was the 19th season of the National Hurling League.

National Hurling League

The National Hurling League saw a major restructuring for the 1949-50 season. Division 1 and Division 2 were combined to form one division of four groups.

Tipperary came into the season as defending champions of the 1948-49 season.

On 24 September 1950, Tipperary won the title after a 1-12 to 3-4 win over New York in the final. It was their 3rd league title overall and their second in succession.

Group A table

Group stage

Group B table

Group stage

Group C table

Group stage

Group D table

Group stage

Knock-out stage
Semi-finals

Home final

Final

References

National Hurling League seasons
League
League